Year 981 (CMLXXXI) was a common year starting on Saturday (link will display the full calendar) of the Julian calendar.

Events 
 By place 

 Europe 
 Spring – Emperor Otto II (the Red) leads the imperial court to Rome, making the city his imperial capital, and receives nobles from all parts of Western Europe. Otto makes plans to conquer Byzantine Italy.
 Fall – Otto II departs with an expeditionary force from Rome, and invades Apulia (Southern Italy) to punish the Saracens. He demands a fleet from Pisa, and imposes a trade embargo against Venice.
 Al-Mansur, the de facto ruler of Al-Andalus, conquers and razes the city of Zamora, as part of his effort to seize the Christian-dominated north of the Iberian Peninsula.

 Asia 
 Summer – Seongjong ascends the throne of Goryeo (Korea) after the death of his brother-in-law (and cousin), king Gyeongjong. 
 The Gommateshwara statue is built by Chavundaraya, minister and commander of the Ganga Dynasty, in India (approximate date).

 By topic 
 Exploration 
 Erik the Red leaves Norway, to survey west of Iceland in Viking longships, that carry nearly 700 people with cattle, horses, and other necessities for starting a colony on the island. Erik finds land and calls it Greenland.

 Religion 
 Spring – Pope Benedict VII dissolves the Slavic bishopric of Merseburg, after conferring with Otto II. He issues an encyclical, forbidding the exaction of money for the conferral of any Holy Order (known as simony).

 Commerce 
 The first commercially made shaving soap sells for 3 dirhams (0.3 dinars).

Births 
 Abu'l-Qasim al-Husayn ibn Ali al-Maghribi, Arab statesman (d. 1027)
 Giovanni Orseolo, Venetian nobleman (d. 1006)
 Li Deming, Chinese general and rebel leader (d. 1032)
 Theodora, Empress of the Eastern Roman Empire (d. 1056)
 Torstein Knarresmed, Norse Viking warrior (approximate date)
 Vladivoj, duke of Bohemia (approximate date)

Deaths 
 February 12 – Ælfstan, bishop of Ramsbury
 June 20 – Adalbert, archbishop of Magdeburg
 July 9 – Ramiro Garcés, king of Viguera (Spain)
 July 12 – Xue Juzheng, Chinese scholar-official and historian
 August 13 – Gyeongjong, king of Goryeo (Korea) (b. 955)
 Abu'l-Faraj Muhammad, Buyid nobleman and statesman
 Amlaíb Cuarán, Viking king of Scandinavian York
 Ibn Khalawayh, Persian scholar and grammar (or 980)
 Pandulf Ironhead, prince of Benevento and Capua
 Slavník, founder of the Slavník Dynasty (Bohemia)
 Wigger I, German nobleman (approximate date)
 Zhao Defang, prince of the Song Dynasty (b. 959)

References